Willoch's First Cabinet was a minority, Conservative Government of Norway. It succeeded Brundtland's First Cabinet (which was a Labour government), after the Conservative victory in the 1981 Storting election; and sat from 14 October 1981 to 8 June 1983. It was replaced by Willoch's Second Cabinet, a coalition of the Conservative, Centre and Christian Democrat parties to form a majority government. Willoch's First Cabinet was the first Conservative-only cabinet since Stang's Second Cabinet of 1893–95, and there has not been another Conservative-only cabinet since.

Members
Willoch's first cabinet had the following composition, with all of its members serving from 14 October 1981 to 8 June 1983:

|}

References

See also
 Second cabinet Willoch
 Norwegian Council of State
 Government of Norway
 List of Norwegian governments

Willoch 1
Willoch 1
1981 establishments in Norway
1983 disestablishments in Norway
Cabinets established in 1981
Cabinets disestablished in 1983